Tipula excisa is a species of True Craneflies.

Distribution
Widespread throughout the West Palaearctic and Russian Far East. The subspecies carpatica is only known from alpine Romania.

References

 

Tipulidae
Diptera of Europe
Insects described in 1833